Alex Cerveny is a Brazilian artist, engraver, sculptor, illustrator and painter, born in São Paulo, Brazil, in 1963.

Career
Independently educated, Alex Cerveny studied drawing and painting with Valdir Sarubbi between 1978 and 1982, metal engraving and printing techniques with Selma D'Affre between 1982 and 1986, and attended the lithography course with Odair Magalhães, at FAAP, in 1982. Still in the early 1980s, he joined the Academia Piolin de Artes Circenses and, later, the Circo Escola Picadeiro, both experiences that had a strong influence on his visual universe.

The character he created when he performed as an acrobatic contortionist, "Elvis Elástico: o Homem de Plástico" (Elvis Elastic: the Plastic Man), returns in the twisted figures that populate his paintings. Alex Cerveny's work alludes to a fantastic world, in which biblical and mythological characters, fauna, flora and surreal landscapes are merged. The relationship with text, with narratives from all times - from antiquity to soap operas - and with the body is also latent in his production. Often it is on the body that the texts are inscribed, and it is through it that the stories are told, acting as a kind of axis on canvas where and from where other elements emerge. This body is almost always male, impregnated with a certain provocation and eroticism - and not infrequently presents traits common to the physiognomy of the artist himself.

Throughout the 1980s and 1990s, he exhibited paintings, drawings, and engravings in important group shows and held several solo exhibitions, establishing himself in the Brazilian contemporary art scene.

His first solo show dates from 1983 at the Elf Galeria de Arte, in Belém do Pará. In 1986, he presented his first solo show in São Paulo, at Galeria Unidade Dois.

In 1988, he started working with Paulo Figueiredo gallery, a partnership that resulted in solo exhibitions in 1988, 1990 and 1993. In 1989, he was part of the group show Panorama da Arte Brasileira Artistas, at MAM-SP.

He participated in the 21st São Paulo Art Biennial (Bienal de São Paulo), in 1991, and won the Prize “Secretaria de Cultura” awarded by the state government of São Paulo for the series Astronomia Babilônica. In the same year, he had his first international exhibition, “Viva Brasil Viva,” in Liljevalchs konsthall, Stockholm, Sweden.

In 1987, 1990 and 1995, he participated in the exhibition “Panorama da Arte Brasileira” (“Brazilian Art Panorama”), organized by the  São Paulo Museum of Modern Art - MAM-SP, winning, in the 1995 edition,  the “Price Waterhouse do Brasil” Award, with the work “Excelsior.”

In 1993, he was invited to attend a workshop at the Tamarind Institute, a division of  the University of New Mexico, in Albuquerque, United States.  At the institute, he was able to perfect his lithography and printing techniques. He visited Tamarind Institute again in 2012, this time as a guest and to work on new prints.

Throughout the 2000s, he offered several art workshops and participated in collaborative projects with institutions such as Comunidade Educativa - Cedac and ACTC - Casa do Coração.

In 2005, he participated in the multidisciplinary project called “Nasca Projekt,” in collaboration with the Department of Geosciences of the Dresden University of Applied Sciences. Led by Dr. Bernd Teichert, it included members of the Maria Reiche Association and Christoph Rust, from Germany. The group made three expeditions to Ica province, in Peru, and from there explored the Nazca lines, geoglyphs made between 200 BC and 800 AD by the Paracas culture and Nazca culture.  These trips resulted in the project called “Nasca Correspondences, with works from Cerveny and Rust and that were shown in many exhibitions. One of them was organized in August 2008 by Galeria Marta Traba, at the Latin American Memorial, in São Paulo, and another was held at the Roemer- und Pelizaeus-Museum Hildesheim, in Hildesheim, Germany, in 2009.

In 2012 he participated in the Trienal of San Juan, Puerto Rico, featuring the drawings from “Nasca Correspondences,” which were this time turned into handmade embroidery. These drawings-embroideries were made in collaboration with embroiders Maria Elita Alves Borges and Ana Claudia Bento dos Santos, mothers who graduated from the ACTC (Associação de Assistência à Criança e ao Adolescente Cardíacos e aos Transplantados do Coração—Association for Children and Adolescents with Heart Disease or Heart Transplant), which is based in São Paulo, Brazil. In 2013 he was invited to participate in the 30th Biennial of Graphic Arts, Ljubljana.

In 2019, on the occasion of the solo exhibition Todos os Lugares, he launched a book with the same name, which according to the artist is an "illustrated glossary of places, enriched with sporadic and almost always true stories." In 2019, he participated in the group show Nous les Abres, at the Fondation Cartier in Paris; and in 2021 in the group show Trees, promoted by the Fondation Cartier at the Power Station of Art in Shanghai. Cerveny is one of the artists invited to the next Sydney Biennale, which will be held in March 2022.

The artist also develops a remarkable work as an illustrator: he was for years a collaborator to the newspaper Folha de São Paulo and developed several projects for illustrated books such as Decameron, by Giovanni Boccaccio, published by Cosac & Naify in 2013 and winner of the Jabuti Award, as well as Pinocchio, by Carlo Collodi, in 2012 by the same publisher, and The Origin of Species, by Darwin, in 2018 by Ubu Editora.

His work belongs to important public collections such as Fondation Cartier Pour L'Art Contemporain in Paris, Museu de Arte Moderna de São Paulo, Pinacoteca do Estado de São Paulo, CCSP - Centro Cultural de São Paulo and Museu de Arte Moderna do Rio de Janeiro.

Sources
Entry at the Visual Arts Encyclopedia edited by Itaú Cultural (Enciclopédia Itaú Cultural de Artes Visuais)

External links
 Official website
 Webpage at Casa Triângulo art gallery website

1963 births
Brazilian artists
Brazilian painters
Brazilian engravers
Living people
People from São Paulo
Date of birth missing (living people)